The 2002–03 NBA season was the Clippers' 33rd season in the National Basketball Association, and their 19th season in Los Angeles. The Clippers had the eighth pick in the 2002 NBA draft, and selected Chris Wilcox from the University of Maryland. During the offseason, the team acquired Andre Miller from the Cleveland Cavaliers. After a 12–16 start to the season, the Clippers lost six straight games, then posted an eight-game losing streak between February and March. Head coach Alvin Gentry was fired after a 19–39 start, and was replaced with former Boston Celtics legend Dennis Johnson. With players like Elton Brand, Corey Maggette, Lamar Odom, Michael Olowokandi, and Quentin Richardson all missing large parts of the season due to injuries, the team fell apart and sank back to the bottom of the Pacific Division with a 27–55 record.

Brand led the team with 18.5 points, 11.3 rebounds and 2.5 blocks per game, while Maggette provided the team with 16.8 points per game. Following the season, Johnson was fired as coach, Odom signed as a free agent with the Miami Heat, Miller signed with the Denver Nuggets, Olowokandi signed with the Minnesota Timberwolves, and longtime three-point specialist Eric Piatkowski signed with the Houston Rockets.

For the season, the team added new blue road alternate uniforms, with white side panels to their jerseys and shorts. These uniforms would last until 2010.

Draft picks

Roster

Roster Notes
 This is Cherokee Parks' second tour of duty with the franchise.  He previously played for the team in 2000-2001.

Regular season

Season standings

Record vs. opponents

Game log

Player statistics

Player Statistics Citations:

Awards and records

Transactions
The Clippers have been involved in the following transactions during the 2002-03 season.

Trades

Free Agents

Additions

Subtractions

Player Transactions Citation:

See also
 2002-03 NBA season

References

Los Angeles Clippers seasons